The Schoolhouse Blizzard, also known as the Schoolchildren's Blizzard, School Children's Blizzard, or Children's Blizzard, hit the U.S. plains states on January 12, 1888. The blizzard came unexpectedly on a relatively warm day, and many people were caught unaware, including children in one-room schoolhouses.

The Schoolhouse/Children's Blizzard of 1888
The blizzard was preceded by a snowstorm from January 6 through January 11, which dropped snow on the northern and central plains and was followed by an outbreak of brutal cold from January 7 to 11.

The weather prediction for the day was issued by the Weather Bureau, which at the time was managed by Brigadier General Adolphus Greely.The indications officer(forecaster) Lieutenant Thomas Mayhew Woodruff in St. Paul Minnesota said: "A cold wave is indicated for Dakota and Nebraska tonight and tomorrow; the snow will drift heavily today and tomorrow in Dakota, Nebraska, Minnesota, and Wisconsin."

On January 11, a strengthening surface low dropped south-southeastward out of Alberta, Canada into central Montana and then into northeastern Colorado by the morning of January 12. The strong surface low rapidly moved into southeastern Nebraska by 3 p.m. on January 12 and finally into southwestern Wisconsin by 11 p.m. that same day.

The blizzard was precipitated by the collision of an immense Arctic cold front with warm moisture-laden air from the Gulf of Mexico. Within a few hours, the advancing cold front caused a temperature drop from a few degrees above freezing to −20 degrees Fahrenheit (-29 degrees Celsius) [ in some places]. This wave of cold was accompanied by high winds and heavy snow. The fast-moving storm first struck Montana in the early hours of January 12, swept through Dakota Territory from midmorning to early afternoon, and reached Lincoln, Nebraska at 3 p.m.

Many who were caught unaware misjudged the weather due to a warm spell. Carl Saltee, a teenage Norwegian immigrant in Fortier, Minnesota remembered that "...on the 12th of January 1888 around noontime it was so warm it melted snow and ice from the window until after 1 p.m." This changed rapidly for the teenager who continued that by 3:30 p.m. "A dark and heavy wall built up around the northwest coming fast, coming like those heavy thunderstorms, like a shot. In a few moments, we had the severest snowstorm I ever saw in my life with a terrible hard wind, like a Hurricane, snow so thick we could not see more than 3 steps from the door at times." The Boston Daily Advertiser reported under the headline "Midnight at Noon" that "At Fargo....mercury 47° below zero and a hurricane blowing...At Neche, Dak. the thermometer is 58° below zero."

What made the storm so deadly was the timing (during work and school hours), the suddenness of the storm, and the brief spell of warmer weather that preceded it. In addition, the very strong wind fields behind the cold front and the powdery nature of the snow reduced visibilities on the open plains to zero. People ventured from the safety of their homes to do chores, go to town, attend school, or simply enjoy the relative warmth of the day. As a result, thousands of people—including many schoolchildren—got caught in the blizzard. The death toll was 235, though some estimate 1,000. Teachers generally kept children in their schoolrooms. Exceptions nearly always resulted in disaster.

This cold front was so self-reinforced that it dropped temperatures all the way down in Veracruz, Mexico before dissipating.

Travel was severely impeded in the days following.

Two months later, yet another severe blizzard hit the East Coast states: This blizzard was known as the Great Blizzard of 1888. It severely affected the east coast, in states like New York and Massachusetts.

The stories 

 Plainview, Nebraska: Lois Royce found herself trapped with three of her students in her schoolhouse. By 3 p.m., they had run out of heating fuel. However, visibility was so poor that they became lost and the children, two nine-year-old boys, and a six-year-old girl, froze to death. The teacher survived, but her feet were frostbitten and had to be amputated.
 Seward County, Nebraska: Etta Shattuck, a nineteen-year-old schoolteacher, got lost on her way home and sought shelter in a haystack. She remained trapped there until her rescue 78 hours later by Daniel D. Murphy and his hired men.  She died on February 6 (an early account to February 7) around 9 A.M. due to complications from surgery to remove her frostbitten feet and legs.
 Near Zeona, South Dakota: The children at the local school were rescued. Two men tied a rope to the closest house and headed for the school. There, they tied off the other end of the rope, and led the children to safety.
The rumor she used a rope to keep the children together during the blinding storm is widely circulated, but one of the children claimed it was not true. All of her pupils survived. That year, "Song of the Great Blizzard: Thirteen Were Saved" or "Nebraska's Fearless Maid", was written and recorded in her honor by William Vincent and published by Lyon & Healy.
 In 1967, a Venetian glass mural of The Schoolhouse Blizzard of 1888 by Jeanne Reynal was installed on the west wall of the north bay in the Nebraska State Capitol building in Lincoln, Nebraska, for the 1967 Centennial Celebration.  The mural, in a semi-abstract style, portrays a purported incident in which a schoolteacher, Minnie Freeman, tied her children together with a clothesline and led them through the storm to safety.
 Ted Kooser, Nebraska poet, has recorded many of the stories of the Schoolhouse Blizzard in his book of poetry "The Blizzard Voices."
 Ron Hansen, a Nebraska-born author, follows the experience of the Blizzard from a variety of perspectives in his short story "Wickedness," featured in the collections Nebraska and She Loves Me Not.
 A 36 year old Scottish immigrant farmer, James Jackson, just outside of Woodstock, Minnesota, discovered his cattle herd frozen to death in a  stretch.
 Newspaperman Charles Morse, founder of the Lake Benton News recounted, "My sleeping quarters were on the second floor leading off a hallway at the head of the stairs...On arriving home I found the wind had forced open the door and the stairway was packed with snow, and when I reached my room I found my bed covered with several inches of snow which had filtered over the threshold and through my keyhole."
 Pioneers William and Kate Kampen, who lived in a small sod house in Marion, South Dakota territory were caught ill-prepared for such a blizzard. He took two of his horses with him. While William was gone, 19-year-old Kate gave birth alone to their first son, Henry Royal Kampen, on January 8, 1888. While in town, the blizzard hit and several of William's friends tried to persuade him to stay in town, but he knew he had to get back home to Kate not knowing she had given birth to their son. The storm was severe and raged on as he tried to make his way back home. He stayed with his horses, but eventually, both of them died because the wind was so strong that both the horses suffocated. William was able to find a barn with pigs in it and so he crawled in with them to try to keep warm. Meanwhile, Kate kept herself and the baby warm by staying in bed. William finally made it back home to Kate and the baby after spending three days and nights out on the prairie alone.
 Lauren Tarshis published a book in February 2018 about the Children's Blizzard in her I Survived (book series), focusing on a character under the name of John.

Memorial book 
In the 1940s a group organized the Greater Nebraska Blizzard Club to write a book about the storm. The resulting book, In All Its Fury: A History of the Blizzard of Jan. 12, 1888, With Stories and Reminiscences, was edited by W.H. O'Gara.

Affected states and territories 
Many of these states were United States territories at the time:

 South Dakota (territory)
 North Dakota (territory)
 Nebraska
 Kansas 
 Minnesota
 Montana (territory)
 Wyoming (territory)
 Idaho (territory)

See also 
 1888 Northwest United States cold wave
 List of Minnesota weather records
 1920 North Dakota blizzard
 Pleasant Hill bus tragedy

References

References 
 
 The Weather Notebook: Schoolhouse Blizzard
 Old Time Nebraska – The Big Brash Blizzard
 Todayshistorylesson.wordpress.com/ Children's Blizzard of 1888
 David Laskin, The Children's Blizzard (2004) 
 Reader's Digest, Discovering America's Past (1993) 
 W. H. O'Gara, In All Its Fury: A History of the Blizzard of January 12, 1888 (1947) 

1888-1
Pacific Northwest storms
1888 meteorology
1888 natural disasters in the United States
 Disasters in schools
 Natural disasters in Kansas
 Natural disasters in Minnesota
 Natural disasters in Montana
 Natural disasters in Nebraska
 Natural disasters in North Dakota
 Natural disasters in South Dakota
 Natural disasters in Omaha, Nebraska
January 1888 events